Stilbosoma is a genus of hoverflies.

Species
Stilbosoma cyaneum Philippi, 1865
Stilbosoma rubiceps Philippi, 1865

References

Diptera of South America
Eristalinae
Hoverfly genera
Taxa named by Rodolfo Amando Philippi